Vercelli Airfield is an airfield located south of Vercelli, Italy. The structure is equipped with a grass track with 09/27 orientation. The airport is managed by the Aero Club Vercelli "Marilla Rigazio" and carries out activities according to the rules of visual flight.

Vercelli Airfield was inaugurated in 1928.

References

External links

Airports in Piedmont
Vercelli
1928 establishments in Italy
Airports established in 1928